CF10 is an EP by Cardiff based grime music band Astroid Boys. Originally released in 2015 on the label Pinky Swear Records, it was later re-released in 2016 when they signed with Music For Nations.

Track listing 
Side A
 "Wake Up" – 3:53
 "Posted" – 4:20
 "Brudda" – 3:10
Side B
 "A48 Blues" – 3:51
 "Scrambled Eggs" – 3:09
 "Justice" – 4:11
 "Slammed 2 Razz" – 2:49

References 

Astroid Boys albums
2015 EPs